Bagrationite is a variety of allanite, discovered by Georgian Prince Peter Bagrationi in 1847 and named in his honour.

References

Calcium minerals
Lanthanide minerals
Yttrium minerals
Aluminium minerals
Iron(II,III) minerals
Epidote group
Monoclinic minerals
Minerals in space group 11